Mud Creek, originally known as Maverick Creek, is a stream in Kinney County, Texas tributary to Sycamore Creek and the Rio Grande.

Maverick Creek was a water and camping place on the San Antonio-El Paso Road.

See also
List of rivers of Texas

In popular culture
The 2002 comedy horror film Bubba Ho-Tep is set in Mud Creek, Texas.

References

Tributaries of the Rio Grande
Rivers of Kinney County, Texas
San Antonio–El Paso Road
Rivers of Texas